René Heitmann (born 4 July 1942) is a Danish modern pentathlete. He competed at the 1972 Summer Olympics.

References

1942 births
Living people
Danish male modern pentathletes
Olympic modern pentathletes of Denmark
Modern pentathletes at the 1972 Summer Olympics
Sportspeople from Frederiksberg